Pleaşa may refer to several places in Romania:

Pleaşa, a village in Bucov Commune, Prahova County
Pleaşa, a village in Vlădeşti Commune, Vâlcea County

See also 
 Pleșa (disambiguation)
 Pleși (disambiguation)
 Pleșoiu (disambiguation)